Gareth Potts (born 25 July 1990) is an English professional rugby league footballer who plays for the Hunslet in the Betfred League 1.

Background
Potts was born in England.

Career
Potts was in the junior systems at the Wakefield Trinity Wildcats and spent time on loan at Doncaster. He has previously played for the Batley Bulldogs.

He has previously played Halifax in the Kingstone Press Championship.

References

External links
(archived by web.archive.org) Halifax profile
(archived by web.archive.org) Scoresway profile

1990 births
Living people
Batley Bulldogs players
Dewsbury Rams players
Doncaster R.L.F.C. players
English rugby league players
Halifax R.L.F.C. players
Hunslet R.L.F.C. players
Rugby league players from Yorkshire
Rugby league wingers